Insulochamus nicoletii is a species of beetle in the family Cerambycidae. It was described by James Thomson in 1857. It is known from the Democratic Republic of the Congo.

References

Lamiini
Beetles described in 1857
Endemic fauna of the Democratic Republic of the Congo